Ceirano may refer to:

People
 Giovanni Battista Ceirano (1860-1912), Italian automobile industrialist, eldest of four Ceirano brothers
 Giovanni Ceirano (1865-1948), Italian automobile industrialist, second of four Ceirano brothers
 Giovanni Ceirano (nuncio) (1927–2006), Vatican diplomat and archbishop 
 Matteo Ceirano (1870-1941), Italian automobile industrialist, third of four Ceirano brothers
 Ernesto Ceirano (1875 -?) an automobile racer, winner of the 1908 Targa Florio, the youngest of the four Ceirano brothers, 
 Giovanni "Ernesto" Ceirano (1889-1956), son of Giovanni Ceirano, industrialist and racing driver

Organisations
Ceirano is the name associated with several Italian automobile companies founded by brothers Ceirano:

 Ceirano GB & C (Ceirano & C.), founded in 1898 by Giovanni Battista and Matteo Ceirano, and was key to the founding of the F.I.A.T. industrial group in 1899
 Fratelli Ceirano (Fratelli Ceirano & C.), founded in 1901 by Giovanni Battista and Matteo Ceirano.
 Itala (Itala Fabbrica Automobili), founded in 1903 by Matteo Ceirano. 
 Ceirano Junior & C, aka Junior F.J.T.A. was founded in 1904 by Giovanni Ceirano. 
 Società Piemontese Automobili S.P.A. (SPA), founded in 1906 by Matteo Ceirano and Michele Ansaldi.
 SCAT (Società Automobili Torino Ceirano), founded in 1906 by Giovanni Ceirano
 Ceirano Fabbrica Automobili or Giovanni Ceirano Fabbrica Automobili, founded in 1917 by Giovanni and his son Giovanni "Ernesto" (used the brand Ceirano)
 SCAT-Ceirano, formed in 1923 from the merger of S.C.A.T. and Ceirano Fabrica Automobili
 Fabrica Anonima Torinese Automobili (FATA) - See Aurea, taken over by Giovanni and his son Giovanni "Ernesto"

See also
 List of automobile companies founded by the Ceirano brothers